Thomas Vernon (1724–1771) was a landowner and Member of Parliament (MP) in eighteenth century England.

He was the only son of Bowater Vernon (1683–1735), who had inherited Hanbury Hall, Worcestershire and large estates in Hanbury and elsewhere from his second cousin Thomas Vernon, who had died childless. Thomas was brought up in London in the family home in New Bond Street, and was only 11 when his father died.

After a spell at University College, Oxford, he was elected as an MP for the Worcester constituency in 1746 to fill the vacancy created by the death of Thomas Winnington.   He continued to represent Worcester till 1761.

Vernon married Emma (1711–77), daughter of Vice Admiral Charles Cornwall of Berrington in Herefordshire. It seems he first married her in the Mayfair Chapel, notorious for conducting clandestine marriages, and perhaps went through a second marriage when it became clear that a record of the first was not properly kept. No record of either marriage, of the christening of either of his children, Emma (1756–1818) or Thomas (born and died 1754), survives.

Thomas was regarded as more sensible than his profligate father Bowater, and spent the last part of his life managing the family estates which stretched to nearly 10,000 acres (40 km²) in Hanbury, Dodderhill, Feckenham and Shrawley in Worcestershire, and in Shropshire and Warwickshire. He died suddenly in December 1771, and left as his heir his only surviving child Emma, who, in 1776, married Henry Cecil, later Earl, then Marquis, of Exeter.

References

Vernon archive in Worcester County Record Office 705:7 BA7335.
Jeffrey Haworth, Guide Book to Hanbury Hall (National Trust)
Rate books for St George's Hanover Sq in Westminster City Archives;
Parish Register for Eye in Herefordshire County Record Office

1724 births
1771 deaths
Members of the Parliament of Great Britain for Worcester
British MPs 1741–1747
British MPs 1747–1754
British MPs 1754–1761